Greatest Hits is the title of two compilation albums released by the American rock band Survivor in 1989 and 1993.

The first Survivor Greatest Hits album was released in 1989, after the band went on indefinite hiatus following the commercial failure of their 1988 album Too Hot to Sleep. The album covers 10 of the band's singles from 1981 to 1988.

The package was reissued in 1993 featuring two new songs recorded with original lead vocalist Dave Bickler.

Track listings

References

External links
 
 
 
 
 

Survivor (band) albums
1989 greatest hits albums
1993 greatest hits albums
Albums produced by Ron Nevison
Scotti Brothers Records compilation albums